Pakuwon City Mall (formerly East Coast Center) is a shopping center located in Surabaya, East Java. Pakuwon City Mall is located right in front of the entrance to the housing Pakuwon City (formerly called Laguna) precisely at Jalan Kejawan Putih Mutiara, Eastern of Surabaya. This shopping center has several notable tenants namely Hypermart, Ace Hardware, Informa, XXI.

In 2020, the East Coast Center was expanded so that it changed its name to Pakuwon City Mall which was inaugurated on November 20, 2020.

References

External links 

 Situs pariwisata Kota Surabaya

Shopping malls in Surabaya
Tourist attractions in East Java